Iru Dhuruvam 2 (இரு துருவம் 2) is a 2023 Indian Tamil-language crime thriller streaming television series, written and directed by Arun Prakash, produced as an Original for SonyLIV under the banner of Applause Entertainment and Sign Of Life Productions.

It is a Sequel to the 2019 series Iru Dhuruvam. It stars Nandha Durairaj, Prasanna, Abhirami Venkatachalam, Linga, Sai Priyanka Ruth and Abdool Lee. The nine episodes series premiered on SonyLIV on 24 February 2023.

Cast
 Nandha Durairaj as Viktor Selladurai
 Prasanna as Lankeswaran
 Abhirami Venkatachalam as Geetha
 Linga
 Sai Priyanka Ruth
 Abdool Lee as Kishore

Production

Development
The announcement of the renewal of the series for the second season was made in October 2021. The shooting of the series began in 2022. The series is produced by Sameer Nair under the production Applause Entertainment, writer and director by Arun Prakash.

Release
The first trailer was released on 19 February 2023.

References

External links 
 

SonyLIV original programming
Tamil-language web series
Tamil-language thriller television series
Tamil-language crime television series
2023 Tamil-language television series debuts